The Last Soul Man is the eighteenth studio album by American singer-songwriter Bobby Womack. The album was released in 1987, by MCA Records.

Track listing

References

1987 albums
Bobby Womack albums
Albums produced by Bobby Womack
Albums produced by Chips Moman
MCA Records albums